Group G of the 2018 FIFA World Cup took place from 18 to 28 June 2018. The group consisted of Belgium, Panama, Tunisia, and England. The top two teams, Belgium and England, advanced to the round of 16, and went on to meet each other again in the third-place play-off.

Teams

Notes

Standings

In the round of 16:
The winners of Group G, Belgium, advanced to play the runners-up of Group H, Japan.
The runners-up of Group G, England, advanced to play the winners of Group H, Colombia.

Matches
All times listed are local time.

Belgium vs Panama
The two teams had never met before this World Cup match.

Yannick Carrasco and Dries Mertens forced early saves from goalkeeper Jaime Penedo. Eden Hazard hit the side-netting after pouncing on a loose backpass from Román Torres. Hazard fired wide in the 26th minute and was left hobbling by heavy challenges from Michael Amir Murillo and Torres. Hazard then shook off the blows and forced Penedo into a save with his legs. After a goalless first half, Mertens steered in a right-foot volley from the right of the penalty area to give Belgium the lead. Kevin De Bruyne almost doubled the lead but narrowly missed the target with a 25-yard free-kick that curled away from Penedo's right-hand post. Belgium doubled their lead in the 69th minute after Romelu Lukaku scored with a diving header after a cross from the left by Kevin De Bruyne. Lukaku then added a third with a chipped finish from the left of the penalty area after a through ball from Hazard.

Belgium's last victory by two goals or more at the FIFA World Cup was a 3–1 defeat of Uruguay in 1990. It also matched their best win in World Cup history, along with a 3–0 victory over El Salvador in 1970.

Tunisia vs England
The two teams had met in two matches, including one game at the 1998 FIFA World Cup group stage, an England 2–0 victory.

England scored in the 11th minute when Mouez Hassen stopped a John Stones' header from a corner from the left, but could not save a Harry Kane follow-up from close range. Hassen was substituted four minutes later for Farouk Ben Mustapha due to an injury earlier in the game, after he had a collision with Jesse Lingard. Lingard then mishit a volley from Ashley Young's cross to the far post. After 10 minutes, Ferjani Sassi equalised from the penalty spot after Kyle Walker was penalised for an elbow on Fakhreddine Ben Youssef. Kane had an appeal for a penalty waved away within five minutes of the restart as he was seemingly impeded by a pair of Tunisia players at a corner. In the additional time, Harry Maguire flicked a Kieran Trippier corner from the right into the path of Kane, who headed it inside the goal after being left free at the back post.

England scored more than once for the first time in 10 World Cup matches, since a 2–2 draw against Sweden in 2006. Kane became the first England player to score a brace in a World Cup match since Gary Lineker against Cameroon in 1990.

Belgium vs Tunisia
The two teams had faced each other in three matches, including one game at the 2002 FIFA World Cup group stage, which ended in a 1–1 draw.

Just 6 minutes into the game, Syam Ben Youssef's late challenge on Eden Hazard was deemed, with the use of VAR, to have been just inside the area and he stepped up to score the penalty into the bottom-left corner. Ten minutes later, Dries Mertens won possession just inside the Tunisia half before driving forward and passing the ball to Romelu Lukaku. Lukaku then shot a low strike across Farouk Ben Mustapha into the bottom-right corner. Wahbi Khazri's free-kick from the left was met by Dylan Bronn, who flashed a header past Thibaut Courtois. Thomas Meunier found Lukaku inside the area, which he clipped over the onrushing Mustapha. Toby Alderweireld's long pass from defence was taken on the chest by Hazard, who then rounded Mustapha to stroke into an empty net. Michy Batshuayi met Youri Tielemans' cross at the back post with a controlled half-volley to score Belgium's 5th. Khazri scored deep into stoppage time after a swivel in the box.

Lukaku became the first player since Diego Maradona to score back-to-back braces in consecutive world cup games. Hazard's penalty was Belgium's second quickest goal in a World Cup match (5:59), behind only Léopold Anoul's goal against England in 1954, in the fifth minute. For Tunisia, it has registered as their worst defeat ever in their World Cup history.

England vs Panama
The two teams had never met before.

John Stones headed in from Kieran Trippier's corner to open the scoring. Harry Kane converted a penalty to make it 2–0 following a foul on Jesse Lingard, who was next to find the net with a curling finish with his right foot from the edge of the area. Stones nodded home the rebound after goalkeeper Jaime Penedo had kept out Raheem Sterling's close-range header. Kane scored his second penalty of the match in the stoppage time of first half, hammering the ball into Penedo's top right corner after referee had spotted a foul on the forward by Fidel Escobar. Kane completed his hat-trick when a deflected shot by Ruben Loftus-Cheek flicked off from his ankle. Felipe Baloy scored Panama's first-ever World Cup goal, with a half-volley from a Ricardo Ávila free-kick. The result ensured that both England and Belgium would advance to the knockout stage, while Tunisia and Panama would be eliminated at the group stage.

Gary Lineker was the last England player before Kane to notch more than one goal in consecutive World Cup matches, 32 years ago. At Mexico 1986, Lineker followed up a hat-trick against Poland with a brace against Paraguay. This was England's biggest win at a major tournament. Stones became the first England defender to score two goals in a World Cup match. Kane is the first player to score at least twice in both of his first two World Cup appearances since Grzegorz Lato of Poland in 1974. Kane is the third England player to score a hat-trick in a World Cup match, after Geoff Hurst against Germany in the 1966 final and Gary Lineker against Poland in 1986.

England vs Belgium
The two teams had met in 21 matches, including two matches at the World Cup, one round of 16 game at the 1990 FIFA World Cup which ended in a 1–0 victory for England, and one group stage game at the 1954 FIFA World Cup which ended in a 4–4 draw. Both teams had already guaranteed to advance to the last 16 before kick off, with the winner securing top spot in the group.

Both teams fielded significantly altered line-ups before the game, with media outlets stating that a loss could potentially become beneficial, as the winner would be in the half of the draw with the 4 of the top 7 sides in the world.

Jordan Pickford kept out a long-range drive from Youri Tielemans before the goalkeeper was rescued by Gary Cahill's goal-line clearance after the ball squirmed out of his grasp. In the 51st minute, Adnan Januzaj cut in from the right and hit a left foot shot into the top left corner of the net. Jamie Vardy sent Marcus Rashford through on goal in the 66th minute, but the striker's effort was turned wide of the post by a touch from Thibaut Courtois.

This 1–0 victory ended Belgium's 82-year winless run against England which dates back to a friendly played in Brussels on 9 May 1936. The scoreline was 3–2 on that occasion. This is the first World Cup match (other than 0–0 draws) in which England failed to score since a 1–0 loss to Portugal in 1986.

Panama vs Tunisia
The two teams had never met before. Both teams had already been eliminated from the tournament before the match.

Panama took the lead in the 33rd minute, after a José Rodríguez shot from outside the penalty area took a deflection off Yassine Meriah and nestle in the back of the net. In the 51st minute, Naïm Sliti found Wahbi Khazri down the right and the latter's low cross was converted by Fakhreddine Ben Youssef just six yards out. At the 66 minute mark, Khazri finished off a cross from the left by Oussama Haddadi from close range at the back post.

Tunisia won a World Cup match after 40 years, since their 3–1 victory over Mexico in 1978. Panama became the first nation since Serbia & Montenegro and Togo in 2006 to lose each of their first three World Cup games. Panama's goal means this is the first World Cup tournament in which every side has scored at least two goals in the competition. Meriah's own goal was the 50th in World Cup history.

Discipline
Fair play points would have been used as tiebreakers if the overall and head-to-head records of teams were tied. These were calculated based on yellow and red cards received in all group matches as follows:
first yellow card: minus 1 point;
indirect red card (second yellow card): minus 3 points;
direct red card: minus 4 points;
yellow card and direct red card: minus 5 points;

Only one of the above deductions were applied to a player in a single match.

References

External links
 2018 FIFA World Cup Group G, FIFA.com

2018 FIFA World Cup
Belgium at the 2018 FIFA World Cup
Panama at the 2018 FIFA World Cup
Tunisia at the 2018 FIFA World Cup
England at the 2018 FIFA World Cup